Zane Clark is a former Cook Islands international rugby league footballer who played as a  in the 1990s and 2000s. He at club level for the Randwick Kingfishers, Hutt Valley Firehawks, Auckland Warriors and the Cessnock Goannas.

Background
Clark was born in New Zealand.

He is of Cook Islands descent.

Early years
A product of the Randwick Kingfishers club in the Wellington local competition, Clark made the Junior Kiwis in 1994 while played for the Hutt Valley Firehawks in the Lion Red Cup.

Warriors
Clark was signed by the Auckland Warriors for the 1998 season as a backup to Syd Eru. When Eru was injured Clark made five first grade appearances for the Warriors.

He was not re-signed for the 1999 season and instead moved to Australia and played for Cessnock Goannas in the local Newcastle Rugby League competition.

World Cup
Clark was named in the Cook Islands squad for the 2000 Rugby League World Cup and played in all three of the team's matches.

References

External links
Statistics at rugbyleagueproject.org
New Zealand Warriors profile

Living people
Cessnock Goannas players
Cook Islands national rugby league team players
Junior Kiwis players
New Zealand sportspeople of Cook Island descent
New Zealand rugby league players
New Zealand Warriors players
Randwick Kingfishers players
Rugby league hookers
Wellington rugby league team players
Year of birth missing (living people)